Ayr County Hospital was a health facility in Holmston Road, Ayr, South Ayrshire, Scotland.

History 
The facility had its origins in an establishment known as the Ayr, Newton and Wallacetown Dispensary which opened in 1817 and was replaced by a hospital in Mill Street in 1844. It moved to purpose-built facilities in Holmston Road, designed by John Murdoch (1825-1907), in 1882. It joined the National Health Service in 1948. After services transferred to the new Ayr Hospital, Ayr County Hospital closed in 1991 and was subsequently demolished.

References 

Hospitals in South Ayrshire
Defunct hospitals in Scotland
1817 establishments in Scotland
Hospitals established in 1817
Buildings and structures in Ayr